The June gap occurs in Ireland and Great Britain when there is a shortage of forage available for honey bees, typically occurring in June.

Subsequent to the massive volume of pollen and nectar produced by trees and hedges in the spring, there is a reduction in the amount of nectar available to the bees due to long grasses suppressing many wildflowers. Before the herbaceous "summer rush" of July-through-September which reinstates the high level of nectar, the high hive populations brought around by trees in the spring struggle to produce honey and may lay fewer eggs.
Beekeepers need to pay special attention to the levels of honey in the hive as well as the level of water the bees use during this gap. Annual weather patterns can cause this event to occur later or earlier.

Some plants which can provide nectar in this gap are Cotoneaster, the closely related Pyracantha, common garden [herbs], and perennial garden plants.

See also
Beekeeping in Ireland
Beekeeping in the United Kingdom
Forage (honeybee)
Honeydew source
List of honey plants
Pollen source

References

 http://www.bbka.org.uk/local/northherts/bm~doc/the-june-gap.pdf

Beekeeping
Beekeeping in the United Kingdom

Pollination